Kamuran Gündemir (1933 - 4 February 2006) was a Turkish pianist born in Ayvalık. 

Born in Ayvalık in 1933. Influenced by his father who was a tuba player at the local municipality band. Learned to read musical notes at the age of three and started to play accordion.  

He is discovered by Adnan Saygun and was advised to attend the conservatory. He entered Ankara State Conservatory in 1949 and graduated in 1958. He was student of Ferhunde Erkin in piano and Necil Kazım Akses and Ulvi Cemal Erkin in composition. He is send to Paris where he was thought by Lazare Lévy in Paris Conservatory. 

He was the teacher of Muhiddin Dürrüoğlu-Demiriz, Fazıl Say, Emrecan Yavuz and Emre Elivar. His last student was Mertol Demirelli.

He was awarded with honorary gold medal by the Sevda-Cenap And Music Foundation in 2001.

References 

Turkish classical pianists
1933 births
2006 deaths